The Turkish Basketball Championship was a top-level basketball championship competition in Turkey, that was run by the Turkish Basketball Federation, from 1946 to 1967. In the 1966–67 season, the competition was replaced by the Turkish Basketball Super League (BSL).

Title holders

 1946: Beykoz
 1947: Galatasaray
 1948: Galatasaray
 1949: Galatasaray
 1950: Galatasaray
 1951: Harp Okulu
 1952: Harp Okulu
 1953: Galatasaray
 1954 Modaspor
 1955: Galatasaray & Modaspor 
 1956: Galatasaray
 1957: Fenerbahçe
 1958: Modaspor
 1959: Fenerbahçe
 1960: Galatasaray
 1961: Darüşşafaka
 1962: Darüşşafaka
 1963: Galatasaray
 1964: Galatasaray
 1965: Fenerbahçe
 1966: Galatasaray
 1967: Altınordu

Performance by club

1955 two domestic champions
On April 25, 1955, the last game of the championship was Fenerbahçe against Galatasaray at Spor Sergi Sarayı. Galatasaray and Modaspor were in the championship race until the last game and they had the same number of points. Therefore, the last game was very important for both Galatasaray and Modaspor since the champion would be determined by total point difference. In the game against Galatasaray, Fenerbahçe officials withdrew their team from the match with just 44 seconds left to the end of the match due to Fenerbahçe being behind by 13 points, with no chance of turning the game. Thus the match could not be concluded. Nevertheless, the Federation of Sports declared that such behavior of the Fenerbahçe officials would not be acceptable and there were two domestic champions, Galatasaray and Modaspor, in that year. The trophy was split into two pieces and both clubs could keep these in their museums.

Final ranking

Pos.=Position, Pld=Matches played, W=Matches won, D=Draws, L=Matches lost, PF=Points for, PA=Points against, PD=Points difference

Turkish basketball clubs in European and worldwide competitions

See also
 Basketbol Süper Ligi
 Turkish Basketball Cup
 Turkish Basketball Presidential Cup
 List of Turkish basketball champions

Notes

References

 Atabeyoğlu, Cem. 1453-1991 Türk Spor Tarihi Ansiklopedisi. page(557).(1991) An Grafik Basın Sanayi ve Ticaret AŞ
 Milliyet Newspaper Archive April 26, 1955
 Durupınar, Mehmet. Türk Basketbolunun 100 Yıllık Tarihi (2009).sf (48). Efes Pazarlama ve Dağıtım Ticaret A.Ş. 

League 1
 
1946 establishments in Turkey
1967 disestablishments in Turkey
Basketball